The 2020–21 Sheffield United W.F.C. season was the club's 19th season and their third in the FA Women's Championship, the second level of the women's football pyramid. Outside of the league, the club also contested two domestic cup competitions: the FA Cup and the League Cup.

Prior to the start of the season, on 7 July 2020, Sheffield United announced they had parted ways with manager Carla Ward after "both parties opted to go down a different path." Neil Redfearn was announced as the new manager on 28 August.

Squad 
.

Preseason

FA Women's Championship

Results summary

Results

League table

Women's FA Cup 

As a member of the top two tiers, Sheffield United will enter the FA Cup in the fourth round proper. Originally scheduled to take place on 31 January 2021, it was delayed due to COVID-19 restrictions.

FA Women's League Cup

Squad statistics

Appearances 

Starting appearances are listed first, followed by substitute appearances after the + symbol where applicable.

|-
|colspan="14"|Players who appeared for the club but left during the season:

|}

Transfers

Transfers in

Loans in

Transfers out

References 

Sheffield United